Information on below, -

External links

1945 in United States case law
1944 in United States case law